Sugar Salt ani Prem is an Indian Marathi language film director, writer and produced by Sonali Bangera. The film stars Sonali Kulkarni, Sameer Dharmadhikari, Ajinkya Dev, Shilpa Tulaskar, Prasad Oak and Kranti Redkar. Music by Siddharth Mahadevan. The film was released on 12th June 2015.

Synopsis 
When tragedy strikes Soumya, she meets two like-minded women, Ananya and Aditi, who are struggling in their lives. When their bond strengthens, they decide to overcome their problems together.

Cast 
 Sonali Kulkarni As Aditi
 Sameer Dharmadhikari as Rahul
 Ajinkya Deo as Ajay
 Kranti Redkar as Soumya
 Shilpa Tulaskar as Ananya
 Prasad Oak as Ravindra

Soundtrack

Critical response 
Sugar Salt aani Prem film received positive reviews from critics. Mihir Bhanage of The Times of India gave the film a rating of 3/5 and wrote "The film is a classic example of how a simple story can be turned into something that grips you and gives you a lesson in morality and empowerment". Ganesh Matkari of Pune Mirror wrote "Maybe this is all unimportant for the filmmaker. Maybe these days people believe that doing a good Marathi film is as simple as designing an AI chair. All you need is finance". Abhijeet Thite of Maharashtra Times gave the film 2.5 stars out of 5 and wrote "Although acting and cinematography are good, I feel that more attention should have been paid to the screenplay".

References

External links 
 
 

2015 films
2010s Marathi-language films
Indian drama films